The 2004–05 FC Sochaux-Montbéliard season was the club's 77th season in existence and the club's fourth consecutive season in the first division of French football. In addition to the domestic league, Sochaux participated in this season's edition of the Coupe de France, the Coupe de la Ligue and the UEFA Cup. The season covers the period from 1 July 2004 to 30 June 2005.

Season summary
Sochaux dropped five places in the table to finish 10th, their lowest finish since promotion in 2001. Manager Guy Lacombe left at the end of the season to manage Paris Saint-Germain. He was replaced by former Ajaccio manager Dominique Bijotat.

First-team squad
Squad at end of season

Left club during season

Competitions

Overview

Ligue 1

League table

Results summary

Results by round

Coupe de France

Coupe de la Ligue

UEFA Cup

First round

Group stage

Round of 32

Notes and references

Notes

References

FC Sochaux-Montbéliard seasons
Sochaux